Marcel Weyland (born 1927) is a translator of Adam Mickiewicz's Pan Tadeusz and of Echoes: Poems of the Holocaust. 'The Word: 200 Years of Polish Poetry', 2010, ed. Brandl & Schlesinger, Blackheath, NSW, Australia, . His most recent published work is the translation of the selected work of Julian Tuwim, Brandl & Schlesinger, Blackheath NSW, .

Life
Weyland was born in Łódź, Poland. His family fled ahead of the Germans in September 1939. They originally fled to Lithuania, where they were fortunate to receive a visa from the Dutch acting consul Jan Zwartendijk for Curaçao and a Japanese transit visa from the Japanese diplomat Chiune Sugihara. From here they went through the Soviet Union to Japan, before being interned for the rest of World War II by the Japanese in Shanghai, China. The family finally settled in Sydney, Australia, in 1946. Here he studied architecture and law.

In 1952, Weyland married artist Phillipa Keane. He still live in Mosman, Sydney, Australia and has five children, 21 grandchildren, and five great grandchildren.

Works
(all translations from Polish into English, retaining the originals' rhythm and rhyming structure):

In 2005, Verand Press, a subprint of Brandl & Schlesinger, published 'Pan Tadeusz'. by Adam Mickiewicz It was begun in the 1950s as an attempt to convey a better sense of the original, and was initially intended for his family in Australia. Encouraged to continue it, he completed it in the hope that it would be of value to a wider audience.

In 2007, 'Echoes: Poems of the Holocaust' was published by Brandl & Schlesinger. It is his translation of poems by Polish poets, Jewish and non-Jewish, written during the Holocaust and after, by survivors and witnesses and others.

In August 2010, the same publisher published 'The Word: 200 Years of Polish Poetry'. It is the first such bilingual anthology ever published.
In  2012 the same publisher published his anthology of the prose and verse of Władysław Leśmian: 'What I Read to the Dead'.

In 2014, the same publisher  published 'Love, Sex and Death in the Poetry of Bolesław Szlengel'.

In 2017, the same publisher published 'Julian Tuwim Selected Poems'.

In 2020, the same publisher published 'Amoroso', 50 Polish love poems and 'Furioso', by three angry poets: Mickiewicz, Słowacki and Tuwim.

In 2022, publication is expected of 'Close to the heart'. selected poems of six 20th C. Polish women poets.

Marcel has been recognised worldwide for his translations. He was awarded the Order of Merit by the Polish government for his contributions to Polish culture in 2005, in 2008 the Medal of the Order of Australia, in 2012 (by the President of Poland) the Officer's Cross of the Order of Merit to the Polish Commonwealth and in 2013 the gold medal Gloria Artis by the Polish Minister of Culture.

See also

 Do prostego człowieka

Notes

External links
 Marcel Weyland's website
 Marcel Weyland's story
 Marcel Weyland: Medal of the Order of Australia (Australian Government website)

1927 births
Australian poets
English-language poets
Polish–English translators
Translators from Polish
Living people
Polish emigrants to Australia
20th-century Polish Jews
People from Łódź